Apollo University Lodge No 357 is a Masonic Lodge based at the University of Oxford aimed at past and present members of the university. It was consecrated in 1819, and its members have met continuously since then.

University of Oxford
Membership of the lodge is restricted to those who have matriculated as members of the University of Oxford. The Lodge's historic records, from its foundation until 2005, are housed in the university's Bodleian Library. The lodge is primarily a part of university social life, but is also involved in other areas of university life through projects such as the Apollo Bursary, administered by the university, through which lodge members provide financial support to certain students.

Due to its association with the university it has had famous members such as Cecil Rhodes, Oscar Wilde, and Albert Edward, Prince of Wales.

To celebrate the bicentenary of the Lodge in 2019, a comprehensive history book was written. It was published in February 2019 by the Bodleian Library, Oxford. Entitled "Oxford Freemasons: A Social History of the Apollo University Lodge", the book is co-authored by Professor J. Mordaunt Crook, an architectural historian, former Slade Professor and Waynflete Lecturer at the University of Oxford, and former Public Orator and Professor of Architectural History at the University of London (who is not a Freemason), and Dr James Daniel, a Fellow of the Royal Historical Society, who has been a member of the Lodge for over fifty years, and is also a former Grand Secretary (chief executive) of the United Grand Lodge of England.

Character
The Lodge (together with the parallel Isaac Newton University Lodge in Cambridge University) has traditionally enjoyed certain privileges, including the right to initiate matriculated members of the university regardless of their age (other Lodges in England and Wales are restricted to candidates aged 21 or older, except by special permission), and the right to initiate candidates in large groups (other lodges are restricted to a maximum of two candidates at a time, except by special permission). In 2005 the Universities Scheme was established, inspired by the long success of Apollo University Lodge and Isaac Newton University Lodge, and now brings similar privileges to more than eighty university masonic lodges in universities across England and Wales.

Other lodges
Apollo University Lodge is the principal masonic lodge for members of the University of Oxford. Other Oxford University lodges include Churchill Lodge No 478 (consecrated 1841) for senior members of the university, St Mary Magdalen Lodge No 1523 (consecrated 1875) for members of Magdalen College, Oxford, and Aedes Christi Lodge No 9304 (consecrated 1989) for members of Christ Church, Oxford. The Oxford and Cambridge University Lodge No 1118 (consecrated 1866) is a London-based lodge for members of both universities.

Notable members

 Albert Edward, Prince of Wales, later King Edward VII
 Sir Thomas Dyke Acland, 11th Baronet, educational reformer and politician 
 Richard Acland, Labour politician and founder of the Campaign for Nuclear Disarmament
 William Anstruther-Gray, Baron Kilmany, Unionist politician
 Aretas Akers-Douglas, 1st Viscount Chilston, Conservative Home Secretary
 Anthony Ashley-Cooper, 7th Earl of Shaftesbury, philanthropist and social reformer
 Joseph Bailey, 1st Baron Glanusk, Conservative politician
 Jonathan Baker, Anglican Bishop of Fulham
 Augustus Bampfylde, 2nd Baron Poltimore, Liberal politician
 Henry Barnes, 2nd Baron Gorell, British Army officer
 Evelyn Baring, 1st Baron Howick of Glendale, colonial governor of Southern Rhodesia and Kenya
 John Baring, 7th Baron Ashburton, chairman of BP
 Charles Bathurst, 1st Viscount Bledisloe, Governor-General of New Zealand
 Bramston Beach, Conservative politician and Father of the House
 Sir Michael Hicks Beach, 8th Baronet, Conservative politician
 Michael Hicks Beach, 1st Earl St Aldwyn, Conservative politician, Chancellor of the Exchequer, and Father of the House
 Tim Beaumont, Green politician and Anglican clergyman
 William Kirkpatrick Riland Bedford, Anglican clergyman and antiquary
 Sir Henry Bellingham, 4th Baronet, Anglo-Irish Conservative politician
 Henry Beresford, 3rd Marquess of Waterford, Anglo-Irish peer and first to "Paint the Town Red"
 Seymour Berry, 2nd Viscount Camrose, newspaperman
 John Edward Courtenay Bodley, civil servant
 Edward Bootle-Wilbraham, 1st Earl of Lathom, Conservative politician and Lord Chamberlain
 Robin Bourne-Taylor, Olympic rower
 George Boscawen, 2nd Earl of Falmouth, Irish peer
 William Brabazon, 11th Earl of Meath, Whig politician
 Thomas Brassey, 1st Earl Brassey, Governor of Victoria
 Lionel Brett, justice on the Supreme Court of Nigeria
 Edward George Bruton, architect
 John Buchan, 2nd Baron Tweedsmuir, naturalist
 Ulick de Burgh, 1st Marquess of Clanricarde, Whig politician and Captain of the Yeomen of the Guard
 William Burdett-Coutts, Conservative politician 
 Peter Butler, Conservative politician
 Sir Edward Buxton, 2nd Baronet, Liberal politician
 Harold Caccia, Baron Caccia, Permanent Under-Secretary of State for Foreign Affairs
 Ian Campbell, 11th Duke of Argyll, Scottish peer and socialite
 Charles Canning, 1st Earl Canning, Governor-General of India
 Robert Carew, 2nd Baron Carew, Irish Whig politician
 Lewis Cave, judge on the Queen's Bench
 Peter Cazalet, cricketeer, jockey, and racehorse trainer
 William Champneys, Anglican clergyman and author
 Charles Chetwynd-Talbot, 19th Earl of Shrewsbury, Conservative politician and Captain of the Honourable Corps of Gentlemen-at-Arms
 Victor Child Villiers, 7th Earl of Jersey, banker, Conservative politician, and Governor of New South Wales
 George Child Villiers, 9th Earl of Jersey, peer who donated Osterley Park to the National Trust
 Esmé Chinnery, cricketeer and aviator
 William Cholmondeley, 3rd Marquess of Cholmondeley, Conservative politician
 Lionel Cohen, Baron Cohen, High Court Judge
 Arthur Collins, courtier and Gentleman Usher
 William Costin, President of St John's College, Oxford
 Francis Cowper, 7th Earl Cowper, Lord Lieutenant of Ireland
 Albert Curtis Clark, Corpus Christi Professor of Latin
 Robert Curzon, 14th Baron Zouche, traveller across the Near East
 Sir Jervoise Clarke-Jervoise, 2nd Baronet, Liberal politician
 Tubby Clayton, founder of Toc H
 John Stanhope Collings-Wells VC, soldier
 St Vincent Cotton, gambler, sportsman, socialite, and soldier
 Arthur Cowley, Bodley's Librarian
 William Craven, 2nd Earl of Craven, peer
 John Crichton, 4th Earl Erne, Conservative politician 
 George Bernard Cronshaw, Principal of St Edmund Hall, Oxford
 Harry Crookshank, Conservative politician and Minister for Health  
 Robert Dillon, 3rd Baron Clonbrock, peer
 Luke Dillon, 4th Baron Clonbrock, peer
 Douglas Dodds-Parker, Conservative politician and expert in irregular warfare
 Claude Gordon Douglas, physiologist
 George Douglas-Hamilton, 10th Earl of Selkirk, Conservative politician and First Lord of the Admiralty 
 Cospatrick Douglas-Home, 11th Earl of Home. Scottish diplomat and nobleman
 Charles Duncombe, 2nd Earl of Feversham, Conservative politician and soldier
 David Dundas, Liberal politician and agricultural improver
 Hugh Alexander Dunn, Australian diplomat
 Jack Duppa-Miller GC, Royal Navy officer 
 Francis Egerton, 1st Earl of Ellesmere, Conservative politician, Chief Secretary for Ireland, and namesake for Ellesmere Island, Canada
 William Ellison-Macartney, Governor of Tasmania and Western Australia
 Godfrey Elton, historian
 Walter Erskine, Earl of Mar and Kellie, peer
 William John Evelyn, Conservative politician
 Geoffrey Faber, publisher and poet
 John Fawcett, organist
 Sir James Fergusson, 6th Baronet, Conservative politician Governor-General of New Zealand and South Australia
 Sir Edmund Filmer, 8th Baronet, Conservative politician
 George Finch, chemist and mountaineer, the first man to climb over 8,000 meters
 Charles FitzGerald, 4th Duke of Leinster, peer
 Charles FitzRoy, 3rd Baron Southampton, peer
 Sir Henry Ralph Fletcher-Vane, 4th Baronet, peer
 Adrian Flook, Conservative politician
 Sir Samuel Fludyer, 3rd Baronet, peer
 Richard Fort, Liberal politician
 Hubert Freakes, South African rugby player
 Gerald Gardiner, Baron Gardiner, Labour politician and Lord Chancellor
 Sir William Geary, 3rd Baronet, Conservative politician 
 Alban Gibbs, 2nd Baron Aldenham, Conservative politician
 Philip Glazebrook, Conservative politician
 George Glyn, 2nd Baron Wolverton, Liberal politician and Paymaster General
 Sir Alexander Grant, 10th Baronet, historian and Principal of the University of Edinburgh
 Edward Grey, 1st Viscount Grey of Fallodon, Liberal politician and Secretary of State for Foreign Affairs
 Leslie Green, philosopher of law
 Frederick William Hall, classicist and President of St John's College, Oxford
 Frederick Halsey, Conservative politician
 James Hamilton, 1st Duke of Abercorn, Conservative politician and Lord Lieutenant of Ireland
 James Hamilton, 2nd Duke of Abercorn, peer and socialite
 William Hamilton, 11th Duke of Hamilton, peer
 Walter Kerr Hamilton, Bishop of Salisbury
 Basil Hamilton-Temple-Blackwood, 4th Marquess of Dufferin and Ava, Conservative politician
 Stuart Hampson, chairman of John Lewis Partnership
 Charles Harbord, 5th Baron Suffield, Liberal politician
 William Harcourt, 2nd Viscount Harcourt, businessman
 Harold B. Hartley, physical chemist
 Charles Harris, Church of England Bishop of Gibraltar
 Edmund Samuel Hayes Irish Conservative politician
 Roger Fleetwood-Hesketh, Conservative politician
 John Hely-Hutchinson, 5th Earl of Donoughmore, Irish peer
 John Hely-Hutchinson, 7th Earl of Donoughmore, Conservative politician
 Auberon Herbert, Liberal politician and theorist of Voluntaryism
 Henry Herbert, 4th Earl of Carnarvon, Conservative politician, Secretary of State for the Colonies, and Lord Lieutenant of Ireland
 Robert Hermon-Hodge, 1st Baron Wyfold, Conservative politician
 Edward Hewetson, cricketeer
 James Hewitt, 4th Viscount Lifford, Irish peer
 Bertram Maurice Hobby, English entomologist 
 Samuel Reynolds Hole, Anglican clergyman and horticulturist
 Gordon Honeycombe, newscaster for ITN
 Sir Archibald Philip Hope, 17th Baronet, aviator
 Henry Tufton, 1st Baron Hothfield, Liberal politician
 Henry Howard, 3rd Earl of Effingham, peer
 George Ward Hunt, Conservative politician and Chancellor of the Exchequer
 Harry Irving, chemist
 Thomas Graham Jackson, architect
 Walter James, 1st Baron Northbourne, Conservative politician 
 Douglas Jardine, captain of the England cricket team
 Sir Frederick Johnstone, 7th Baronet, Conservative politician 
 Sir Frederick Johnstone, 8th Baronet, Conservative politician 
 Sir Love Jones-Parry, 1st Baronet, founder of Y Wladfa
 Edmund Hegan Kennard, Conservative politician
 Anthony Kershaw, Conservative politician
 Henry Kingsley, novelist
 Thomas Kilner, plastic surgeon
 Edward Knatchbull-Hugessen, 2nd Baron Brabourne, Liberal politician 
 Geoffrey Hugo Lampe, theologian
 Osbert Lancaster, cartoonist
 Lambert Blackwell Larking, antiquarian
 Prince Leopold, Duke of Albany, youngest son of Queen Victoria
 Sir Edmund Lechmere, 3rd Baronet, Conservative politician
 George Legh, Conservative politician
 Francis Leighton, Warden of All Souls College, Oxford
 Sir Baldwyn Leighton, 8th Baronet, Conservative politician
 Alan Lennox-Boyd, 1st Viscount Boyd of Merton, Conservative politician and Secretary of State for the Colonies
 Granville Leveson-Gower, 2nd Earl Granville, Liberal politician and Secretary of State for Foreign Affairs
 Richard Lewis, Bishop of Llandaff
 John Llewellin, 1st Baron Llewellin, Conservative politician, President of the Board of Trade, and Governor-General of the Federation of Rhodesia and Nyasaland
 Walter Long, 1st Viscount Long, Irish Unionist politician, Secretary of State for the Colonies, and First Lord of the Admiralty 
 Robert Lowe, Liberal politician, Chancellor of the Exchequer, and Home Secretary 
 Roger Lumley, 11th Earl of Scarbrough, Conservative politician, British Army general, and Governor of Bombay
 Richard Lumley, 12th Earl of Scarbrough, peer and soldier
 Charles Lyell, Liberal politician
 Duncan Mackinnon, rower who won gold at the 1908 Summer Olympics
 Angus Macnab, perennialist philosopher
 William Macrorie, Bishop of Pietermaritzburg
 David Maddock, Bishop of Dunwich
 John Malcolm, 1st Baron Malcolm, Conservative politician
 John Malcolm, 1st Baron Malcolm of Poltalloch, Conservative politician
 Sir Alexander Malet, 2nd Baronet, diplomat and writer
 Tony Marchington, biotechnologist and owner of the LNER Class A3 4472 Flying Scotsman
 Walter Marcon, cricketeer
 Roger Makins, British ambassador to the United States
 Walter Mant, Anglican priest
 David Frederick Markham, Canon of Windsor
 James Marshall, Chief Justice of the Supreme Court of the Gold Coast
 Nevil Story Maskelyne, geologist and mineralogist
 John Cecil Masterman, Vice-Chancellor of the University of Oxford and spymaster in charge of the Double-Cross System
 Schomberg Kerr McDonnell, Principal Private Secretary to the Prime Minister
 Sir Henry Meux, 2nd Baronet, Conservative politician and owner of the Horse Shoe Brewery
 Bobby Milburn, Anglican priest and dean of Worcester Cathedral
 Charles Thomas Mills, Conservative politician and Baby of the House
 Eric Archibald McNair VC, soldier
 George Monckton-Arundell, 7th Viscount Galway, Conservative politician
 William Monsell, 1st Baron Emly, Liberal politician and President of the Board of Health
 William Monson, 1st Viscount Oxenbridge, Liberal politician
 Archibald Montgomerie, 17th Earl of Eglinton, peer
 Henry Moseley, physicist who provided the physical justification for the atomic number and discovered Moseley's law
 Charles Mott-Radclyffe, Conservative politician
 Francis Needham, 3rd Earl of Kilmorey, Conservative politician
 Alexander Nicoll, Regius Professor of Hebrew
 Henry Northcote, 1st Baron Northcote, Conservative politician, Governors of Bombay, and Governor-General of Australia
 John Norwood VC, soldier
 Frederick Oakeley, Church of England Canon of Westminster before converting to the Roman Catholic Church
 James Adey Ogle, physician
 Ralph T. O'Neal, Premier of the Virgin Islands
 George Osborne, 8th Duke of Leeds, peer
 Frank Pakenham, 7th Earl of Longford, Labour Party politician, Leader of the House of Lords, and Secretary of State for the Colonies
 Walter Parratt, organist and composer
 William D.M. Paton, pharmacologist
 Henry Pelham-Clinton, 5th Duke of Newcastle, Secretary of State for War and the Colonies
 Henry Pelham-Clinton, 6th Duke of Newcastle, peer
 Charles Perceval, 7th Earl of Egmont, Conservative politician
 Henry Percy, 7th Duke of Northumberland, Conservative politician, Lord High Steward, and Treasurer of the Household
 William Pery, 3rd Earl of Limerick, Conservative politician and Captain of the Yeomen of the Guard
 Edmund Pery, 5th Earl of Limerick, soldier and sportsman
 Sir Henry Peyton, 3rd Baronet, Conservative politician
 John Platts-Mills, Labour politician who helped form the Labour Independent Group
 Jacob Pleydell-Bouverie, 4th Earl of Radnor, peer
 Melville Portal, Conservative politician
 Frederick Pottinger, police inspector in New South Wales who fought the Bushrangers
 Arthur Porritt, Baron Porritt, physician, sportsman who won a bronze medal in the 100 m sprint at the 1924 Summer Olympics, and Governor-General of New Zealand
 Thomas Powys, 4th Baron Lilford, ornithologist
 Arthur Purey-Cust, Church of England priest and author
 Cecil Rhodes, imperialist, Prime Minister of the Cape Colony, and mining magnate
 Matthew White Ridley, 2nd Viscount Ridley, Conservative politician 
 Arthur Rivers, dean of St David's Cathedral, Hobart
 Ellis Robins, 1st Baron Robins, businessman
 John Rous, 4th Earl of Stradbroke, peer
 George Rushout, 3rd Baron Northwick, Conservative politician  
 Oliver Russell, 2nd Baron Ampthill, imperial administrator, Governor of Madras and Viceroy of India
 William Russell, 8th Duke of Bedford, Whig politician
 Bulmer de Sales La Terriere, soldier 
 Daniel Sandford, classicist
 Duncan Sandys, Conservative politician, Secretary of State for Defence, and Secretary of State for the Colonies 
 James Edwards Sewell, Warden of New College, Oxford
 Ernest Hamilton Sharp, barrister in Hong Kong
 Walter Francis Short, clergyman and schoolmaster
 Sir John Simeon, 3rd Baronet, Liberal politician and president of the Canterbury Association
 William Somerville, 1st Baron Athlumney, Liberal politician and Chief Secretary for Ireland
 Henry Southwell, Bishop of Lewes
 Frederick Smith, 2nd Earl of Birkenhead, historian
 George Spencer, Bishop of Madras
 John Spencer-Churchill, 7th Duke of Marlborough, Conservative politician, Lord President of the Council, and Lord Lieutenant of Ireland
 Krishnan Srinivasan, Indian diplomat and civil servant, Foreign Secretary of India, and Commonwealth Deputy Secretary-General
 Haldane Stewart, composer and cricketeer
 Randolph Stewart, 9th Earl of Galloway, Lord Lieutenant of Kirkcudbright
 Alan Stewart, 10th Earl of Galloway, Irish peer and Conservative politician
 James Stubbs, Grand Secretary of the United Grand Lodge of England
 Ernest Swinton, soldier who developed the term tank and Chichele Professor of Military History at All Souls College, Oxford
 Thomas Taylour, Earl of Bective, Conservative politician
 Lord Alexander Thynne, Conservative politician
 Henry Tizard, chemist, President of Imperial College London, and helped develop radar
 Henry James Tollemache, Conservative politician 
 Hugh Trevor-Roper, historian and Regius Professor of History
 Charles Arthur Turner, Chief Justice of the Madras High Court
 Henry Baker Tristram, parson-naturalist, ornithologist, and traveller across North Africa and the Near East
 Richard St John Tyrwhitt, Church of England clergyman and art critic
 George Upton, 3rd Viscount Templetown, Anglo-Irish soldier and peer
 George Vane-Tempest, 5th Marquess of Londonderry, Conservative politician and diplomat
 Henry de Vere Vane, 9th Baron Barnard, peer
 Sir Harry Vernon, 1st Baronet, Liberal politician
 Walter Wardle, Archdeacon of Gloucester
 George Warren, 2nd Baron de Tabley, Liberal politician and Treasurer of the Household
 John Warren, 3rd Baron de Tabley, poet, numismatist, botanist and an authority on bookplates
 Thomas Dewar Weldon, philosopher
 Oscar Wilde, poet and playwright
 Robert Williams, Conservative politician
 Watkin Williams, Bishop of Bangor
 Walter Bradford Woodgate, sportsman who founded Vincent's Club and invented the coxless four
 John Wolfenden, Baron Wolfenden, educationalist who wrote the Wolfenden report 
 Edward Murray Wrong, historian and vice-president of Magdalen College, Oxford
 Windham Wyndham-Quin, 4th Earl of Dunraven and Mount-Earl, Irish Conservative politician and soldier, Under-Secretary of State for the Colonies, and founder of the Irish Reform Association

References

Masonic Lodges
Clubs and societies of the University of Oxford
United Grand Lodge of England